Saint Joan of Arc Church or Sainte Jeanne d'Arc Church or variants may refer to:

 St. Joan of Arc Chapel, Milwaukee, Wisconsin, USA
 St. Joan of Arc's Church (Bronx, New York), USA
 St Joan of Arc's Church, Farnham, Surrey, England, UK
 Church of St Joan of Arc, Rouen, France
 Basilica of Sainte-Jeanne-d'Arc (Paris), France
 Sainte Jeanne d'Arc Church (Besançon), France
 Sainte Jeanne d'Arc Church (Nice), France